The 2017 Montreux Volley Masters is a women's volleyball competition set in Montreux, Switzerland.

Participating teams

Squads

Group stage

Group A 

|}

|}

Group B 

|}

|}

Classification round

|}

Final round

Semifinal 

|}

3rd place

|}

Final

|}

Final standings

Awards

Most Valuable Player
  Ana Carolina da Silva
Best Outside Spikers
  Natália Pereira	
  Yamila Nizetich	
Best Libero
  Lenka Dürr
	
Best Middle Blockers
  Ana Carolina da Silva
  Marie Schölzel		
Best Setter
  Roberta Ratzke
Best Opposite Spiker
  Gong Xiangyu
Special awards Crowd favorite
  Pimpichaya Kokram

References

2017
Montreux Volley Masters
Montreux Volley Masters
Montreux Volley Masters